Little Sarsfield Lake is a small lake in geographic Bompas Township in the Unorganized West Part of Timiskaming District, in northeastern Ontario, Canada. The lake is in the James Bay drainage basin and is the source of Sarsfield Creek.

The primary outflow is Sarsfield Creek, which flows via Woollings Creek, the Whiteclay River, the Black River, the Abitibi River and the Moose River to James Bay.

The nearest community is Sesekinika,  to the northeast.

References

Other map sources:

Lakes of Timiskaming District